Sony Sports Network, formerly Sony Pictures Sports Network, and also known as Sony TEN, is a group of Indian pay television sports channels owned by Culver Max Entertainment (formerly Sony Pictures Networks India).

The original TEN Sports channel was first established on 1 April 2002 by Abdul Rahman Bukhatir. It was acquired by Essel Group in 2010, and was added to Essel's existing Zee Sports channel, launched in 2005. After the acquisition, Zee launched two new channels, TEN Cricket and TEN Golf, and rebranded Zee Sports as TEN Action.

In August 2016, Sony Pictures Networks India acquired all of the sports channels under Zee from Essel. In 2017, the networks were formally merged with Sony's existing Sony ESPN and Sony Six channels as Sony Pictures Sports Network, with the TEN channels rebranded as Sony TEN. The channels were then rebranded as Sony Sports Network in October 2022, with all five channels now carrying the "Sony Sports Ten " prefix.

History 
In January 2001, Taj Television Ltd. was formed in Dubai with Abdul Rahman Bukhatir as a backer. Bukhatir had various business interests and was known for transforming Sharjah as a major international cricket venue. The company launched the channel as TEN Sports (as part of its Taj Entertainment Network) on 1 April 2002. As of March 2004, the company was headed by Chris McDonald as CEO and had 100 employees.

In June 2005, Zee Telefilms Limited launched Zee Sports, reportedly India's first private sports channel. Zee Telefilms acquired a 50% stake in TEN Sports for 800 crore rupees (₹) in 2006, and eventually acquired the remainder of its Indian operations in 2010. The sale did not include its Pakistani operations, which were retained by Essel Group via the subsidiary Tower Sports.

In 2010, Zee rebranded Zee Sports as Ten Action which featured adventure sports and non-cricket content. In 2011 Zee launched a new channel called Ten Cricket, exclusively for cricket matches. In March 2016, all channels in the Zee network were rebranded as Ten 1, Ten 2, and Ten 3 respectively.

In August 2016, Sony Pictures Networks India announced its intent to acquire Zee's sports networks for US$385 million; the first phase of the sale, which included equity stakes in the holding companies Taj Television (India) Pvt. Ltd. and part of Taj TV Limited Mauritius, was completed in February 2017 for US$350 million. On 18 July 2017, all of Sony's sports channels in India were rebranded as Sony TEN, and high-definition feeds of Sony TEN 2 and 3 were also launched. The remainder of the sale was completed in September 2017.

The networks, along with new sisters Sony Six and Sony ESPN, were branded under the umbrella name Sony Pictures Sports Network, and began to phase in a rebranding as Sony Sports in 2020. Sony ESPN was shut down on 30 March 2020.

In June 2021, Sony launched Sony TEN 4, which broadcasts in the Telugu and Tamil languages. Actor Rana Daggubati served as a promotional ambassador for the network's launch.

On 24 October 2022, the Sony Pictures Sports Network was rebranded as Sony Sports Network, as part of a wider rebranding of all Culver Max Entertainment channels under versions of the global Sony television branding. Its channels were likewise rebranded under the new prefix "Sony Sports Ten", and Sony Six was brought under the Ten branding for the first time as Sony Sports Ten 5.

Programming 

In 2019, SPN renewed its agreement with the Ultimate Fighting Championship for Sony TEN 2 and SonyLIV, through 2023.

WWE programming 
Sony Sports is the Indian rightsholder to WWE professional wrestling programs, under a contract dating back to 2002 and its establishment as TEN Sports, and most recently renewed in 2020 under a five-year deal. The current agreement covers its weekly programs Raw, SmackDown, and NXT, WWE Network content on SPN's streaming service SonyLIV, and includes a commitment to hold "even bigger live events" in the country.

In 2017, SPN and WWE began producing a Hindi-language program WWE Sunday Dhamaal, which airs on Sony Max, and features recaps of Raw and Smackdown, as well as interviews and interactive features. In January 2021, WWE produced a two-hour special event specifically for the Indian market, Superstar Spectacle, to coincide with Republic Day, which featured matches showcasing current and developmental WWE talent of Indian heritage, and was simulcast with English and Hindi commentary across Sony TEN and Sony Max. WWE has considered India to be one its largest international markets; in 2019, WWE's Senior Director of Talent Development Canyon Ceman stated that that Raw and SmackDown had an average of 50 million viewers weekly on SPN.

Channels

Sony Sports Ten 1 
An English-language channel that broadcasts events from the World Athletics Championships, Asian Games, Commonwealth Games and Sukma Games. Its programming schedule also consists on live coverage of tennis, rally, horse racing, beach volleyball events and basketball. WWE Raw and SmackDown are currently broadcast live weekly, along with NXT, Main Event, Sunday Dhamaal and all premium live events.

Sony Sports Ten 2 
An English-language channel that broadcasts football matches from European football leagues such as Bundesliga of Germany and MMA promotion Ultimate Fighting Championship (UFC) in English.

Sony Sports Ten 3 
A Hindi-language channel that airs cricket matches from the Pakistan, Sri Lanka, England and Australia cricket boards. It also broadcasts football matches. Sony Ten 3 and Sony Ten 3 HD broadcasts UFC matches in SD and HD format respectively in Hindi language.It also broadcasts WWE with Hindi commentary.

Sony Sports Ten 4 
Is a Free-to-view Channel A Telugu and Tamil-language channel launched on 1 June 2021.It broadcasts WWE in Tamil and Telugu commentary.

Sony Sports Ten 5 

An English-language channel originally launched as Sony Six in April 2012, prior to the acquisition of TEN. It has historically featured international cricket.

Former channels

Sony ESPN 
Sony KIX was launched on 8 April 2015 by what is now Sony Pictures Networks India, it was the second sports television channel launched by the company after Sony Six. The channel was rebranded as Sony ESPN on 17 January 2016.

Sony and ESPN would partner together on website and app efforts, with ESPN providing and producing content such as cricket, football, tennis, basketball, badminton, field hockey, golf, rugby union, motorsport along with other events. Sony Six and Sony ESPN, which were launched before Sony's purchase of Ten, effectively became part of the group when the acquisition was completed. Sony ESPN was shut down on 31 March 2020.

Sony Ten Golf 
It was an HD, golf-focused channel launched on 7 October 2015. It had the broadcasting rights to the European Tour, Asian Tour, Ryder Cup, LPGA Tour, Royal Trophy, US PGA Championship, Senior PGA Championship, Professional Golf Tour of India, and Ladies European Tour. The channel was closed on 31 December 2018.

Programming rights

Tennis 
 Australian Open
 US Open
 French Open

Cricket
 International Cricket in England - 2018-28
 Big Bash League, 2017-18 to 2022-23
 International cricket in Australia 2017-18 to 2022-23
 International cricket in Sri Lanka 2020-23
 International cricket in Pakistan 2021-23
 Pakistan Super League 2021-23
 Lanka Premier League

Football

National teams

FIFA World Cup qualification - UEFA 
 UEFA European Championship
 UEFA European Championship qualifying
 UEFA Nations League
 Copa América
 International friendlies -UEFA
 CONMEBOL–UEFA Cup of Champions

Clubs
 UEFA Champions League
 UEFA Europa League
 UEFA Conference League
 UEFA Super Cup
 Bundesliga
 DFB-Pokal
 DFL-Supercup
 FA Cup
 FA Community Shield

Mixed martial arts
 UFC

Professional wrestling
 WWE

Volleyball
 Prime Volleyball League

Footnotes

References 

Television channels and stations established in 2002
Television stations in Mumbai
Sony Pictures Networks India
2017 mergers and acquisitions
2002 establishments in Maharashtra
Sports television networks in India